Isøyane Bird Sanctuary is a bird reserve at Svalbard, Norway, established in 1973. It includes Nordre Isøya and Isøykalven in the Isøyane island group in Wedel Jarlsberg Land. The protected area covers a total area of around 2,300,000 square metres.

References

Bird sanctuaries in Svalbard
Protected areas established in 1973
1973 establishments in Norway
Ramsar sites in Norway